a Beautiful Reel. B'z Live-Gym 2002 Green ~Go★Fight★Win~ is the fifth live VHS/DVD released by Japanese rock duo B'z. It features live footage of the Green Live Gym Tour, one of their famous Live Gym Tours.

Track listing 
Go★Fight★Win

Zero
Love Me, I Love You
Warp
Surfin' 3000GTR
Blue Sunshine
Koi-Uta (恋歌)(Tak Matsumoto's song from his solo album Hana)
Koi-Gokoro
Hadashi No Megami (裸足の女神)
Devil
Everlasting
Fireball
Liar! Liar!
Samayoeru Aoi Dangan (さまよえる蒼い弾丸)
Giri Giri Chop (ギリギリ Chop)
Ultra Soul
Atsuki Kodou no Hate (熱き鼓動の果て)
Juice

External links 
B'z Official Website 

B'z video albums
2002 video albums
Live video albums
2002 live albums